Secret of the Andes (El secreto de los Andes) is a 1998 Argentine-American fantasy adventure film co-written and directed by Alejandro Azzano. It stars Roshan Seth as a powerful shaman, Camilla Belle as a nine-year old young girl with unusual gifts, David Keith as her archaeologist father, Nancy Allen as her mother and John Rhys-Davies as a Catholic priest.

Synopsis
When Diana's behavior causes her to be suspended from her school in New York City, her mother takes her to join her father, an archaeologist working in a village in the Andes. He is looking for the missing half of the golden disc of Huáscar, which legend says can grant eternal life. Diana meets the local shaman and discovers her own mystical powers.

Cast
 Camilla Belle ... Diana Willings 
 David Keith ... Brooks Willings 
 Nancy Allen ... Brenda Willings
 Roshan Seth ... Don Benito
 John Rhys-Davies ... Father Claver 
 Jerry Stiller ... Dr. Goldfisch
 José Luis Alfonzo ... Lázaro
 Gianni Lunadei
 Rodrigo Barrena ... Sancho Benito
 Betiana Blum ... Mama Lola
 Leandro López ... Lucho Benito

Critical response 
The critical reception was mostly negative in the Argentine press.  Adolfo C. Martínez wrote in La Nación that the film "was so short of imagination that does not resist the slightest analysis (...) If its makers though of a movie for children, they err their target...if they though of a movie for older audiences, nobody at an adult age can become captivated by the absurdities shown on screen". Juan Villegas, from the El Amante del Cine magazine wrote that "there was an exciting story to be tell, but they forgot to shoot it".

Accolades 
Secret of the Andes won a silver Remi in the 2000 edition of the WorldFest-Houston International Film Festival. The movie was also nominated to best film in the 1998 edition of the Mar del Plata International Film Festival.

References

External links
 
 

1998 films
1990s children's adventure films
1990s fantasy adventure films
American children's adventure films
American fantasy adventure films
Argentine children's films
Argentine fantasy adventure films
English-language Argentine films
Films about children
Films about families
Films set in Argentina
Films set in New York City
Treasure hunt films
1990s English-language films
1990s American films
1990s Argentine films